Jimmy Sundman (born 7 March 1989) is a Finnish footballer who has played for Finnish Veikkausliiga club IFK Mariehamn.

References

External links
  Profile at ifkmariehamn.com

1989 births
Living people
Finnish footballers
IFK Mariehamn players
Veikkausliiga players
Sportspeople from Åland
Swedish-speaking Finns
Association football forwards